Vital Blue is an album by American trumpeter Blue Mitchell recorded in 1971 and released on the Mainstream label.

Reception
The Allmusic review awarded the album 3 stars.

Track listing
All compositions by Blue Mitchell except as indicated
 "Booty Shakin'"  (Ernie Wilkins) - 5:20   
 "Vital Blue"  (Wilkins) - 5:17   
 "Unseen Sounds" (Jimmy Bond) - 3:24   
 "Herman's Helmet" (Jack Wilson) - 6:57   
 "I Love You" (Cole Porter) - 5:09   
 "For All We Know" (J. Fred Coots, Sam M. Lewis) - 2:32  
Recorded in New York City on June 26 & 27, 1971.

Personnel
Blue Mitchell - trumpet
Joe Henderson - flute, tenor saxophone
Ernie Watts - tenor saxophone
Walter Bishop, Jr. - piano
Stanley Gilbert - bass
Doug Sides - drums
Susaye Greene - vocals (3, 5, 6)

References

Mainstream Records albums
Blue Mitchell albums
1971 albums
Albums produced by Bob Shad